Leander Paes and Purav Raja were the defending champions but chose not to defend their title.

Matt Reid and John-Patrick Smith won the title after defeating Hans Hach Verdugo and Luis David Martínez 6–4, 4–6, [10–8] in the final.

Seeds

Draw

References
 Main Draw

JSM Challenger of Champaign-Urbana - Doubles
2018 Doubles